Howell Cobb (August 3, 1772 – May 26, 1818) was an American politician, farmer and soldier.

Born in Granville County, North Carolina, Cobb later moved to Louisville, Georgia. From February 23, 1793, until January 31, 1806, Cobb served in various military positions in the United States Army including ensign and lieutenant in the Second Sub Legion and as captain in the Artillerists and Engineers.

In 1806, Cobb was elected as Democratic-Republican to the 10th United States Congress, and he was reelected to that position in the 11th, and 12th United States Congresses. He resigned from Congress before October 1812 to accept a captain's commission in the U.S. Army to fight in the War of 1812. After his second period of military service, he returned to his plantation, Cherry Hill, northwest of Louisville. Cobb died there in 1818 and was buried in the family cemetery on that estate. At time of his death he owned several slaves. In his will he emancipated his slave William Hill, and left the rest of his slaves to his nephew Howell Cobb. In his will he stated:

Cobb's nephew and namesake Howell Cobb served as the Speaker of the U.S. House of Representatives, Governor of Georgia, U.S. Secretary of the Treasury and Provisional President Pro Tem of the Confederate States of America

References

External links

 Retrieved on 2008-03-19
Howell Cobb (1772–1818) entry at The Political Graveyard
William J. Northen,  Men of Mark in Georgia, A. B. Caldwell, 1912, pp. 443–444.

1772 births
1818 deaths
United States Army personnel of the War of 1812
American planters
People from Granville County, North Carolina
People from Louisville, Georgia
United States Army officers
Democratic-Republican Party members of the United States House of Representatives from Georgia (U.S. state)
People of colonial North Carolina
Burials in Georgia (U.S. state)
American slave owners